La Isla de los FamoS.O.S. 1, was the first season of the show La Isla de los FamoS.O.S and the third season of Survivor to air in Spain and it was broadcast on Antena 3 from January 23, 2003 to February 27, 2003. This season took place in the Dominican Republic. Beginning with this season there was a dramatic change in the format of the Spanish version of Survivor. First, instead of the contestants being mainly regular citizens, they were well known celebrities or former contestants of previous reality shows. Second, instead of tribal council elimination votes, contestants nominated other contestants for eviction through nominations and a leader appointed nominee(s) and the public decided who would be eliminated from the game. Third, as opposed to any of the previous seasons (as well as any that followed) this season only had eight initial contestants competing for the prize money with a ninth (María José Besora) entering following the voluntary exit of Nani Gaitán. Ultimately, it was Daniela Cardone, a famous model born in Argentina, who beat out Ismael Beiro, the well known winner from Gran Hermano season 1, and well known journalist Miguel Temprano for the €60,000 grand prize.

Finishing order

Nominations table 

: As the winner of the first immunity challenge, Miguel could not be nominated for elimination.
: As the winner of the first leadership challenge, Ismael was given the power to name a second nominee for elimination.
: As the previous leader, Ismael could not be nominated for elimination through normal nominations.
: As the winner of the second leadership challenge, Daniela was given the power to name a second nominee for elimination.
: As the previous leader, Daniela could not be nominated for elimination through normal nominations.
: As the winner of the third leadership challenge, Alejandra was given the power to name a second nominee for elimination.
: As the previous leader, Alejandra could not be nominated for elimination through normal nominations.
: As the winner of the fourth leadership challenge, Ismael was given the power to name a second nominee for elimination.
: As the previous leader, Ismael could not be nominated for elimination and could the first nominee in the event of a nominations tie as well as the second nominee.
: The lines were open to vote for the winner.

External links
https://web.archive.org/web/20030207113333/http://www.antena3tv.com/a3tv/index.htm

Survivor Spain seasons
Celebrity reality television series